Prudden is an English surname.

Notable people with this surname include:
 Bonnie Prudden, American physical fitness pioneer
 Edward Prudden, Canadian politician
 George H. Prudden, American engineer
 Josh Prudden, Australian footballer
 Peter Prudden, English Puritan
 Theophil Mitchell Prudden, American pathologist